Emotional security is the measure of the stability of an individual's emotional state. Emotional insecurity or simply insecurity is a feeling of general unease or nervousness that may be triggered by perceiving of oneself to be vulnerable or inferior in some way, or a sense of vulnerability or instability which threatens one's self-image or ego.

The concept is related to that of psychological resilience in as far as both concern the effects which setbacks or difficult situations have on an individual. However, resilience concerns over-all coping, also with reference to the individual's socioeconomic situation, whereas the emotional security specifically characterizes the emotional impact. In this sense, emotional security can be understood as part of resilience.

The notion of emotional security of an individual is to be distinguished from that of emotional safety or security provided by a non-threatening, supportive environment. A person who is susceptible to bouts of depression being triggered by minor setbacks is said to be less "emotionally secure". A person whose general happiness is not very shaken even by major disturbances in the pattern or fabric of their life might be said to be extremely emotionally secure.

Emotional insecurity

Abraham Maslow described an insecure person as a person who "perceives the world as a threatening jungle and most human beings as dangerous and selfish; feels like a rejected and isolated person, anxious and hostile; is generally pessimistic and unhappy; shows signs of tension and conflict, tends to turn inward; is troubled by guilt-feelings, has one or another disturbance of self-esteem; tends to be neurotic; and is generally selfish and egocentric." He viewed in every insecure person a continual, never dying, longing for security.

An insecure person lacks confidence in their own value, and one or more of their capabilities, lacks trust in themself or others, or has fears that a present positive state is temporary, and will let them down and bring about loss or distress by "going wrong" in the future. This is a common trait, which only differs in degree between people.

This is not to be confused with humility, which involves recognizing one's shortcomings but still maintaining a healthy dose of self-confidence. Insecurity is not an objective evaluation of one's ability but an emotional interpretation. Two people with the same capabilities may have entirely different levels of insecurity.

Insecurity may contribute to the development of shyness, paranoia and social withdrawal, or alternatively it may encourage compensatory behaviors such as arrogance, aggression, or bullying, in some cases.

The fact that the majority of human beings are emotionally vulnerable, and have the capacity to be hurt, implies that emotional insecurity could merely be a difference in awareness.

Insecurity has many effects in a person's life. There are several levels of it. It nearly always causes some degree of isolation as a typically insecure person withdraws from people to some extent. The greater the insecurity, the higher the degree of isolation becomes. Insecurity is often rooted in a person's childhood years. Like offense and bitterness, it grows in layered fashion, often becoming an immobilizing force that sets a limiting factor in the person's life. Insecurity robs by degrees; the degree to which it is entrenched equals the degree of power it has in the person's life.
As insecurity can be distressing and feel threatening to the psyche, it can often be accompanied by a controlling personality type or avoidance, as psychological defense mechanisms.

Brain chemistry
To a certain extent, emotional security is a function of brain chemistry: some people are naturally predisposed to feel less happy, and to be more adversely affected by natural events, for example in the case of hypothyroidism. Certain medications, such as SSRI's or even stimulants, are often prescribed to address such natural deficiencies. The side-effects of these medications, however, in many cases can negate their positive effects, for example when certain anti-depressants make it difficult or impossible to experience orgasm by making the brain incapable of cutting off the flow of certain hormones usually associated with positive emotions but necessary to suddenly block for short periods of time in order for orgasm to occur. It is also said that such medications blunt both 'the highs and the lows,' sapping, for some people, a valuable, inspiring energy from life. However, weighing the pros against the cons of such situations is something different for each individual, and in many cases the dangers of naturally low emotional security may be worse than the side-effects of the appropriate medication, especially such as when a person is suicidal.

Philosophies
There are many philosophies which understand emotional security to be a product of outlook. Such ideologies would advocate that there are safer steps than medicine one can take in order to increase one's emotional security. These options may range from self-help programs, substance abuse treatment programs, and psychotherapy to physical exercise and spiritual or religious devotion. While emotionally insecure people may feel lethargic, sometimes their best option is to increase their endorphins through exercise; while they may be afraid of rejection, this may lead to unhealthy loneliness, which the only way to overcome is to risk rejection by trying to make acquaintances. Practices such as yoga and Buddhism advocate abstinence from mind-altering substances; yoga is a physical, mental, and spiritual practice or discipline for achieving clarity of mind and security of attitude through training and disciplining the body, while Buddhism is in essence a practice designed to address suffering.

Philosophers of existentialism deal with issues relating to emotional insecurity quite frequently, focusing on the individual's spiritual condition in the world, existentialism being a more emotionally and psychologically oriented philosophy than other more rationalist schools. Søren Kierkegaard dealt with emotions such as anxiety, dread, and despair, pointing to the role they can play in bringing about life-changing transformation.

See also
 Happiness
 Anxiety
 Uncertainty
 Confusion
 Jealousy
 Vulnerability

References

Attachment theory
Emotional issues
Emotions
Mental health
Narcissism
es:Inseguridad emocional
fr:Insécurité
pt:Insegurança emocional